The paper mulberry (Broussonetia papyrifera, syn. Morus papyrifera L.) is a species of flowering plant in the family Moraceae.  It is native to Asia, where its range includes Taiwan, China, Japan, Korea, Southeast Asia, Myanmar, and India. It is widely cultivated elsewhere and it grows as an introduced species in parts of Europe, the United States, and Africa. Other common names include tapa cloth tree.

Origin
Paper mulberry was used among ancient Austronesians in making barkcloth. It originates from subtropical regions in mainland Asia and is one of the best examples for the mainstream "Out of Taiwan" hypothesis of the Austronesian expansion. Various genetic studies have traced the origins of paper mulberry populations in the Remote Pacific all the way to Taiwan via New Guinea and Sulawesi. In the Philippines, which was along the expansion path, paper mulberries are mostly descendants of modern introductions in 1935. Ancient introductions of paper mulberry presumably went extinct in prehistory due to their replacement with hand-woven fabrics, given that paper mulberry generally only survives under human cultivation. However, its absence in the Philippines further underlines its origins in Taiwan, and not within island Southeast Asia. Additionally, paper mulberry populations in New Guinea also show genetic inflow from another expansion out of Indochina and South China.

It is believed to be the most widely transported fiber crop in prehistory, having been transported along with the full range of the Austronesian expansion, as opposed to most of the other commensal crops in Oceania. Paper mulberry is present in almost every island or island group in Polynesia, including Rapa Nui and Aotearoa. Some populations have gone recently extinct after they stopped being cultivated, such as in the Cook Islands and Mangareva, although accounts and prepared barkcloth and herbarium specimens of them exist in museum collections gathered by Europeans during the colonial era. They were spread by Polynesians primarily through vegetative propagation with cuttings and root shoots. If the feral plants reproduced sexually is unknown, as the plants are dioecious and require both male and female specimens to be present in one island. The tree was introduced to New Zealand by early Māori settlers (oral histories mention the Ōtūrereao, Tainui and Aotea canoes as being sources). The tree was commonly seen during the voyages of James Cook in the 1770s, however the tree likely became extinct by the 1840s, due to reduced cultivation and predation by pigs and cattle who fed on the tree. It was reintroduced to New Zealand from Japanese plants during European colonisation.

Description
The leaves are variable in shape, even on one individual. The blades may be lobed or unlobed, but they usually have toothed edges, lightly hairy, pale undersides, and a rough texture. The species has male and female flowers on separate plants. Each individual protruding fruit in the cluster is a drupe.

Uses
This plant has been cultivated in Asia and some Pacific Islands for many centuries for food, fiber, and medicine.

Barkcloth

Paper mulberry is primarily used in the Pacific Islands to make barkcloth (tapa in most Polynesian languages). Barkcloth can also be made from other members of the mulberry family (Moraceae), including Ficus (figs) and Artocarpus. Barkcloth was also occasionally made from Pipturus nettles, especially in Hawaii. However, the highest quality of barkcloth was from paper mulberry.

Barkcloth was mainly used for clothing among ancient Austronesians and is traditionally made using characteristic stone or wooden beaters, which are among the most common artifacts found in Austronesian archaeological sites. Numerous archaeological remains of barkcloth beaters in southern China have been regarded as evidence that the pre-Taiwan Austronesian homelands were located in the region prior to the southward expansion of the Han Dynasty, particularly around the Pearl River Delta. The oldest such remains are from the Dingmo Site in Guangxi, dated to around 7,900 BP. Barkcloth remained an important source of clothing fabrics in pre-colonial Melanesia, Polynesia, and parts of Indonesia. However, it has been mostly replaced by woven fiber clothing in most of Island Southeast Asia and Micronesia. It is still worn ceremonially in parts of Polynesia and Melanesia. It is also used to make bags and bedding.

Although numerous names are used for paper mulberry throughout Austronesia, none are cognates, thus a Proto-Oceanic term cannot be reconstructed. In most of Polynesia, the term for barkcloth can be reconstructed from Proto-Nuclear-Polynesian *taba, meaning "bark", with cognates including Wayan taba; Tongan, Samoan, Mangareva, and Rarotongan tapa; and Hawaiian kapa. Other terms widely used for barkcloth and paper mulberry are derived from the Proto-Polynesian reconstructed word *siapo, with cognates including Niue, Tongan, and Marquesan hiapo; and Samoan and East Futunan siapo. The term for barkcloth beater, however, can be reconstructed more extensively back to Proto-Malayo-Polynesian *ikay, with cognates including Uma ike; Sa'a iki; Bauan, Tongan, and East Futunan ike; and Samoan and Hawaiian iʻe.

In New Zealand, traditional Polynesian methods for producing barkcloth (aute) were retained by early settlers, despite the tree not growing as large in temperate New Zealand. Presumably the tree was used by early Māori for cloth, however by the 1770s, the primary use was to create a soft, white cloth used for fillets or in ear piercings by high-status men. Barkcloth textiles disappeared from use in the early 19th century, coinciding with the tree's disappearance from New Zealand.

Paper
It is a significant fiber crop in the history of paper. It was used for papermaking in China starting some time between the 2nd and 8th century. Washi, a Japanese handcrafted paper, is made with the inner bark, which is pounded and mixed with water to produce a paste, which is dried into sheets. It is also used to make hanji, a Korean paper.

Other uses
The wood of the plant is useful for making furniture and utensils, and the roots can be used as rope. The fruit and cooked leaves are edible.

The fruit, leaves, and bark have been used in systems of traditional medicine. For example, the bark and fruit of the species, known locally as jangli toot, are used as a laxative and antipyretic in rural Pakistan.

The species is used as an ornamental plant. It tolerates disturbance and air pollution, so it has been useful as a landscaping plant on roadsides. It is a pioneer species that easily fills forest clearings, and it has been considered for reforestation efforts. It grows well in many climate types.

Invasive weed
The ability of the plant to readily colonize available habitat, particularly disturbed areas, has helped it become an invasive species in some regions. It spreads rapidly when male and female individuals grow together and seeds are produced. Seed dispersal is accomplished by animals that eat the fruits, and the plants can form wide, dense stands via their spreading root systems.

This is considered to be one of the worst weeds in Pakistan, one of the most significant invasive plants on the Pampas in Argentina, and a dominant invasive in the forests of Uganda.

The pollen is allergenic. It is reportedly a main culprit of inhalant allergy in Islamabad, where the species is a very common urban weed. The pollen allergy and asthma caused by this plant sends thousands of patients to hospitals in Islamabad during March. The species should not be taken to other areas without due consideration of the potential of male plants to shed their injurious pollen.

Gallery

See also
Domesticated plants and animals of Austronesia

References

External links
 
 

Moraceae
Plants described in 1753
Fiber plants
Medicinal plants of Asia
Flora of tropical Asia
Flora of China
Flora of Eastern Asia
Papermaking
Dioecious plants